Governor Burton may refer to:

Bartholomew Burton (1690s–1770), Governor of the Bank of England from 1760 to 1762
Francis Nathaniel Burton (1766–1832), Acting Governor of Lower Canada from 1824 to 1825
Hutchins Gordon Burton (1774–1836), 22nd Governor of North Carolina
Ralph Burton (died 1768), Military Governor of Quebec from 1763 to 1766
William Burton (governor) (1789–1866), 39th Governor of Delaware